Molony may refer to:

Brian Molony, Canadian self-admitted compulsive former gambler from Toronto
Brian Molony (footballer) (1932–1995), Australian rules footballer
Damien Molony (born 1984), Irish actor now based in London
David Matthew Molony, New Zealand cricketer active from 1985 to 1988
David Molony (1950–2002), Irish Fine Gael politician
Gweneth Molony (born 1932), Australian figure skater
Helena Molony or Helena Moloney (1883–1967), Irish republican, feminist and labour activist
Herbert Molony, DD, MA, missionary of the Anglican Church
J. C. Molony (1877–1948), author, administrator and civil servant of the Indian civil service
John Molony (born 1927), Australian historian, academic and author
Martin Molony (born 1925), Irish retired jockey
Mary Xavier Molony (1781–1865), Irish Presentation Sister, the first nun to establish Catholic schools in Newfoundland
Patricia Molony, Australian figure skater
Richard Molony (carriage maker) (1839–1938), manufacturer of carriages in 19th Century Los Angeles, California
Richard S. Molony (1811–1891), U.S. Representative from Illinois
Rowland Molony (born 1946), British poet and novelist
Senan Molony, the current Political Editor for the Irish Daily Mail
Steven Molony (born 1988), American actor, screenwriter, and film producer
Thomas Molony, PC, QC (1865–1949), the last Lord Chief Justice of Ireland
Trevor Molony (1897–1962), cricketer

See also
Chouteau v. Molony or Aboriginal title in the Taney Court United States v. Brooks
Molony baronets, of the City of Dublin, is a title in the Baronetage of the United Kingdom
Molochny
Moloney (disambiguation)